Vostok Games is a Ukrainian video game developer based in Kyiv. The company was founded in March 2012 by former employees of GSC Game World, including Oleg Yavorsky, following GSC's shutdown. The company developed Fear the Wolves, a battle royale game released in 2019, and is developing Survarium, a free-to-play shooter game.

History 
Vostok Games' precursor, GSC Game World, was shut down by its founder, Sergiy Grygorovych, on 9 December 2011. Following the closure, Oleg Yavorsky, who had been GSC's public relations manager, alongside many former GSC employees, set out to create a game on their own. They worked with several investors in Ukraine and Russia, but none had a large enough budget to fund the development of a game on the same scale as S.T.A.L.K.E.R. 2, which had been cancelled with GSC's demise. Because of this, the development team lowered their ambition for the game, concluding that they would develop a free-to-play multiplayer shooter game for personal computers. Following this change, several investors stepped forward, and in March 2012, the team came in contact with Vostok Ventures, which was looking for a game development team. An agreement between the two parties was reached within two weeks, and Vostok Games was founded that same month, shortly after which the company settled in offices in an industrial park in Kyiv. In September 2013, Vostok Games employed 40 former GSC employees in these offices. Yavorsky acts as marketing manager for the studio.

Games developed

References

External links 
 

Video game development companies
Video game companies of Ukraine
Video game companies established in 2012
Companies based in Kyiv